The Forum Piscarium was the fish market of ancient Rome (a forum venalium), north of the Roman Forum, between the Sacra Via and the Argiletum. It was burned in 210 BC and rebuilt the next year. In 179 BC it was incorporated in the general Macellum, built by Marcus Fulvius Nobilior in the same region.

This forum is called piscatorium in Livy, and piscarium in Varro and Plautus (Curc. 474).

References 

 Lacus Curtius - Forums of Ancient Rome

Buildings and structures completed in the 3rd century BC
Piscarium